Mark Obidozie Chukwuemeka Nwokeji (born 30 January 1982) is an English footballer.

Career
Born in Manchester, Nwokeji was the 200 metres All-England Schoolboy champion prior to becoming a footballer. His former clubs include Walton & Hersham, Harlow Town, Leatherhead, Chesham United, Ware, St Albans City and Staines Town. Whilst with Staines on a part-time basis, Nwokeji studied as a law student.

Nwokeji signed for League Two side Dagenham & Redbridge from Isthmian Premier outfit Staines Town, where he was a prolific goalscorer, in May 2008. He scored on his debut for the Daggers on 9 August 2008, in a 6–0 home win against Chester City. He went on to make 20 appearances for Dagenham in all competitions in the 2008–09 season, scoring five times, before suffering a serious knee ligament injury in January 2009 that ruled him out for nine months.

On 12 November 2009, Nwokeji signed for Conference Premier side Luton Town on a two-month loan in order to regain match sharpness after his injury, scoring his first goal for the club in the FA Cup against Rotherham United on 28 November 2009. This was then extended to the end of the season on 13 January 2010, after he impressed Luton manager Richard Money. His loan at the club ended on 7 May 2010.

On 9 June 2010, Nwokeji signed for AFC Wimbledon, subject to scans on a recurrent cruciate ligament injury.

In June 2011, he joined Havant & Waterlooville. However, having failed to secure a first-team spot, making only four appearances, Nwokeji left Havant in September 2011. Later during the 2011–12 season, he rejoined Staines Town. In the summer of 2012, Nwokeji joined Kingstonian.

References

External links
Mark Nwokeji player profile at the Dagenham & Redbridge website

Mark Nwokeji player profile at NonLeagueDaily.com

1989 births
Living people
English footballers
Association football forwards
Walton & Hersham F.C. players
St Albans City F.C. players
Staines Town F.C. players
Dagenham & Redbridge F.C. players
Luton Town F.C. players
AFC Wimbledon players
English Football League players
National League (English football) players
English people of Nigerian descent
Leatherhead F.C. players
Footballers from Manchester
Havant & Waterlooville F.C. players
Kingstonian F.C. players
Merstham F.C. players
Eastleigh F.C. players
Ware F.C. players
Chesham United F.C. players
Black British sportspeople